L. acaulis may refer to:
 Limosella acaulis, a flowering plant species
 Lysipomia acaulis, a plant species endemic to Ecuador